Villa del Prado is a municipality of the Community of Madrid, Spain.

Sights include the church of Santiago Apóstol.

References 

Municipalities in the Community of Madrid